Davidson Kempner Capital Management LP (“Davidson Kempner”) is a global institutional alternative investment management firm with over $36 billion in assets under management. Davidson Kempner is headquartered in New York City, with additional offices in London, Hong Kong, Dublin, Philadelphia, Shenzhen and Mumbai. The firm is led by Anthony A. Yoseloff who serves as Executive Managing Member and Chief Investment Officer.

As of June 30, 2022, Davidson Kempner was ranked as the 8th largest hedge fund in the world.

Davidson Kempner has approximately 500 employees in the firm’s seven offices. The firm is headquartered at 520 Madison Avenue in New York, New York.

History
Davidson Kempner was founded in May 1983 by Marvin H. Davidson and was initially named M.H. Davidson & Co. Thomas L. Kempner, Jr. joined the firm in December 1984 and was promoted to partner in 1986 and appointed to executive managing member in January 2004. The firm opened to outside capital in 1987 and was registered as an investment adviser with the U.S. Securities and Exchange Commission in 1990. Anthony A. Yoseloff joined in August 1999 and became a managing member in January 2004. Yoseloff became co-deputy executive managing member in January 2012, and co-executive managing member with Kempner as of January 1, 2018. Kempner retired at the end of 2019.

Investment strategies 
Davidson Kempner employs a bottom-up, fundamental method of investing with an event driven focus and a multi-strategy approach.

The firm invests globally in a variety of credit and equity strategies as well as real assets.

Management 
Anthony A. Yoseloff is Executive Managing Member and Chief Investment Officer at Davidson Kempner Capital Management. Yoseloff serves on the Board of Trustees of Princeton University and is a member of the Board of Directors of PRINCO, the investment manager of the Princeton University endowment. Yoseloff also serves as a member of the Board of Trustees and on the investment committee of The New York Public Library as well as a member of the Board of Trustees and Vice Chair of the investment committee at New York-Presbyterian. He is a member of the Council on Foreign Relations.

The firm has 13 managing members.

References

External links
 Davidson Kempner Capital Management corporate website

Financial services companies established in 1983
Hedge funds
Hedge fund firms in New York City
Alternative investment management companies
Institutional investors
Privately held companies of the United States